The 2005 European 10,000m Cup was the 9th edition of the annual 10,000 metres competition between European athletes, which was held at San Vicente Stadium in Barakaldo, Spain on 2 April. A total of 37 athletes (22 men and 15 women) from 12 European nations entered the competition, plus three African pacemakers running as guests.

Spain won the men's team event with a combined time of 1:23:53.88 hours, led by individual winner Juan Carlos de la Ossa. Portugal won the women's team race with a total time of 1:38:36.35, led by individual runner-up Fernanda Ribeiro. Sabrina Mockenhaupt (the sole German female entrant) won the women's individual race. Only three nations fielded enough athletes to qualify for the team section, and Germany only did so in the men's race.

Results

Men's individual

Women's individual

Men's team 

 Athletes in  italics  did not score for their team but received medals

Women's team 

 Athletes in  italics  did not score for their team but received medals

References

Results
Results. Association of Road Racing Statisticians. Retrieved 2020-05-24.

External links
 European Athletics website 

European 10,000m Cup
European Cup 10,000m
Barakaldo
Sport in Biscay
International athletics competitions hosted by Spain
10,000m Cup
10,000m Cup
April 2005 sports events in Europe